The 2006 Girls' Youth NORCECA Volleyball Championship was played from July 23 to July 31, 2006 in Gainesville, Florida, United States. Six teams competed in this tournament. United States won the tournament for the fourth time defeating Dominican Republic. Puerto Rico joined the United States and Dominican Republic to compete at the 2007 Girls' U18 World Championship. Team USA's Tarah Murrey won the tournament MVP award.

Competing nations

Squads

Preliminary round
All times are in Atlantic Standard Time (UTC−04:00)

Group A

Final round

Fifth place match

|}

Bronze medal match

|}

Final

|}

Final standing

Individual awards

Most Valuable Player

Best Scorer

Best Spiker

Best Blocker

Best Server

Best Setter

Best Receiver

Best Libero

Best Defense

References

External links
Official Website
Regulations

2006
P
International volleyball competitions hosted by the United States
2006 in women's volleyball